Formation skydiving is a skydiving event where multiple skydivers attach themselves to one another by grabbing each other's limbs or by the use of "grippers" on their jumpsuit while free falling through the sky. The goal of this skydiving program is to build a formation of multiple divers arranged in a geometric pattern.

Sub-categories

Formation skydiving can be further divided into several sub-categories, so named for the number of members in a team:
4-way sequential
4-way vertical sequential (VFS, Vertical Formation Skydiving)
8-way sequential
16-way sequential
10-way speed
Large formations (Big-ways)

Competitive format

A competition in 4-way formation skydiving (FS-4) takes place like this:

There are two kinds of formations, called randoms and blocks. The randoms are singular formations with full separation of all grips both before and after building the formation. The blocks are double formations with a special designated movement pattern in between, called an inter. The start formation may, or may not be similar to the ending formation. The inters are differently performed. Here are some examples:

Inter 1: The grips are released between some of the flyers, so they become two pieces of two team members. they both do a 270 degree turn, and reconnect to a different formation

Inter 2: Three people stay connected, and do a 360 turn, while the last person, flies alone.

Inter 15: All grips are released and everyone does a 360 turn back to the original formation.

Blocks are designated by numbers, while randoms got letters. Blocks are worth one point for each correct formation, that makes 2 points, and randoms count as 1 point. There are 22 blocks and 16 randoms.

competition consists of up to 10 rounds, and each round consists of 5 or 6 points, which the teams are to repeat as many times as they can within the working time of 35 seconds. The score judging are based on the videographers material.

A competition draw may look like this:
1: C-E-B-13
2: 14-20-8
3: 15-16-H
4: J-O-1-D
5: 6-18-19
6: 5-F-21
7: 10-K-G-M
8: 22-3-P
9: 12-9-4
10:11-17-Q

The winning team will be the team that has collected most points, by completing the most correct formations within time after the final round is ended. In case of weather or technical problems, or other causes, a competition will be valid as long as all teams has completed at least one round.

A recent sub-category of formation skydiving is vertical formation skydiving (VFS).  Skydivers build formations using higher-speed body positions normally associated with freeflying, such as head down and sitflying.

World Record

BIG-WAY:
The current FAI world record for largest free-fall formation is a 400-way, set on February 8, 2006, in Udon Thani, Thailand by the World Team. It was held for 4.3 seconds.  With the support of the Thai government, they used five C-130 Hercules airplanes and exited from an altitude of 25,400 feet. In April 2013 the World Team tried to break the record for the largest 2-point formation dive in skydiving history. All 222 members came together and made a formation, broke apart, and then reformed to make a completely different formation. The team attempted the jump many times and came very close to breaking the record, but were unsuccessful each time. The World Team has not made anymore official statements about attempting the record again. 

Longest sequence in one round:
4-Way
Set by the Belgian team(NMP-PCH Hayabusa), at the World Meet 2018 in round 6, where they posted 62 points in working time (35 seconds)
8-Way
Set by the U.S. (Golden Knights) national team, at the "5th Dubai International Parachute Championship" in 2015, in round 2, where they posted 33 points in working time (50 seconds)

World Championship

See also

 Canopy formation

References

External links
 Article about formation skydiving on Dropzone.com

Parachuting